The 2020 FIA Junior World Rally Championship was the nineteenth season of the Junior World Rally Championship, an auto racing championship recognised by the Fédération Internationale de l'Automobile, running in support of the World Rally Championship. The Junior World Rally Championship was open to drivers under the age of thirty—although no such restriction existed for co-drivers—competing in identical one-litre Ford Fiesta R2s built and maintained by M-Sport. The championship was contested over four selected WRC rounds with the winning crew awarded a new Ford Fiesta R5 car, 200 tyres, free registration into the 2021 World Rally Championship-3 and five free rally entries. The championship offered an additional prize of €15,000 to the highest-placed rookie driver to fund a drive in the 2021 Junior World Rally Championship.

Jan Solans and Mauro Barreiro were the reigning drivers' and co-drivers' champions. Sweden is the reigning Nations' Trophy winner. Tom Kristensson and Joakim Sjöberg won the 2020 junior championships, while Sweden sealed a back-to-back Nations' Trophy.

Calendar
The 2020 Junior World Rally Championship calendar consisted of four events taken from the 2020 World Rally Championship.

Calendar changes
The 2020 calendar was revised from the 2019 schedule. The Tour de Corse and Wales Rally GB were removed from the calendar, while events in Chile and Germany were added in their place. However, Rally Chile was later cancelled in the face of ongoing political unrest in the country, and Wales Rally GB was added back onto the calendar. Rally Italia Sardegna was postponed in response to the COVID-19 pandemic. A new calendar was revised after the championship was interrupted by six months. Ypres Rally was set to be the season's finale, but were unable to do so as the rally was cancelled due to the COVID-19 pandemic. The finale moved to Monza instead.

Entries
The following crews are entered into the championship:

Results and standings

Season summary

Scoring system
Points are awarded to the top ten classified finishers. An additional point is given for every stage win. 1.5-time bonus points were awarded for both drivers' and co-drivers' championships at the season's finale.

FIA Junior World Rally Championship for Drivers
(Results key)

FIA Junior World Rally Championship for Co-Drivers
(Results key)

FIA Junior WRC Trophy for Nations
(Results key)

Notes

References

External links
 
 FIA Junior World Rally Championship 2020 at ewrc-results.com

Junior World Rally Championship
Junior World Rally Championship